Siphonogobius nue is a species of goby native to the coastal waters of Japan where it occurs on sandy substrates with rocks or artificial structures for concealment. Males of this species grows to a length of  SL while the females only reach  SL. This species is the only known member of its genus.

References

Gobiidae
Monotypic fish genera
Fish described in 1998